This article shows the rosters of all participating teams at the women's handball tournament at the 2016 Summer Olympics in Rio de Janeiro.

Age, caps and goals as of the start of the tournament, 6 August 2016.

Group A

Angola
The following is the Angola roster in the women's handball tournament of the 2016 Summer Olympics.

Head coach: Filipe Cruz

Brazil
The following is the Brazilian roster in the women's handball tournament of the 2016 Summer Olympics.

Head coach:  Morten Soubak

Montenegro
The following is the Montenegrin roster in the women's handball tournament of the 2016 Summer Olympics.

Head coach: Dragan Adžić

Norway
The following is the Norwegian roster in the women's handball tournament of the 2016 Summer Olympics.

Head coach:  Thorir Hergeirsson

Romania
The following is the Romanian roster in the women's handball tournament of the 2016 Summer Olympics.

Head coach:  Tomas Ryde

Spain
The following is the Spanish roster in the women's handball tournament of the 2016 Summer Olympics.

Head coach: Jorge Dueñas

Group B

Argentina
The following is the Argentine roster in the women's handball tournament of the 2016 Summer Olympics.

Head coach: Eduardo Peruchena

France
The following is the French roster in the women's handball tournament of the 2016 Summer Olympics.

Head coach: Olivier Krumbholz

Netherlands
The following is the Dutch roster in the women's handball tournament of the 2016 Summer Olympics.

Head coach:  Henk Groener

Russia
The following is the Russian roster in the women's handball tournament of the 2016 Summer Olympics. On 12 August, Tatyana Yerokhina was added to the squad after Anna Sedoykina was ruled out for the test of the tournament due to an injury.

Head coach: Yevgeni Trefilov

South Korea
The following is the South Korean roster in the women's handball tournament of the 2016 Summer Olympics.

Head coach: Lim Young-chul

Sweden
The following is the Swedish roster in the women's handball tournament of the 2016 Summer Olympics. On 16 August, Hanna Blomstrand replaced Michaela Ek due to an injury.

Head coach: Henrik Signell

Statistics

Player representation by club
Clubs with 6 or more players represented are listed.

Player representation by league

The Greek, Japanese, Italian and Hungarian squads were made up entirely of players from the respective countries' domestic leagues. The Montenegrin squad was made up entirely of players employed by abroad country clubs.

Coaches representation by country
Coaches in bold represent their own country.

See also
Handball at the 2016 Summer Olympics – Men's team rosters

References

External links

Women's team rosters
2016
Olymp
Women's events at the 2016 Summer Olympics